Eric Cleon Larson (September 3, 1905 – October 25, 1988) was an American animator for the Walt Disney Studios starting in 1933, and was one of the "Disney's Nine Old Men".

Biography 
Born in Cleveland, Utah, Larson was the son of Danish immigrants Peter, a clothing salesman, and Nora. He worked on such films as Snow White and the Seven Dwarfs, Pinocchio, Fantasia, Bambi, The Three Caballeros, Make Mine Music, Melody Time, Cinderella, Alice in Wonderland, Peter Pan, Lady and the Tramp, Sleeping Beauty, One Hundred and One Dalmatians, The Sword in the Stone, The Jungle Book, and The Many Adventures of Winnie the Pooh. Throughout the years, Larson has animated characters on classics like The Aristocats and Robin Hood and also provided the titles on The Rescuers (along with Mel Shaw and Burny Mattinson). In the 1980s his work was minor, but he served as animation consultant on animated films and shorts like Mickey's Christmas Carol, The Black Cauldron, and The Great Mouse Detective.

In 1973, he began a recruitment training program that brought a new generation of animators into the Disney studio.  Many well-known figures in animation today went through Larson's training program, including Brad Bird, Don Bluth, Chris Buck, Tim Burton, Randy Cartwright, Ron Clements, Andreas Deja, Gary Goldman, Ed Gombert, Mark Henn, Dan Haskett, Glen Keane, Bill Kroyer,  John Lasseter, John Musker, Phil Nibbelink, Richard Rich, Burny Mattinson, Melvin Shaw, Jeffrey J. Varab, John Pomeroy, Joe Ranft, Jerry Rees, Henry Selick and Tad Stones among many others.

Larson was married to Gertrude Larson. By his retirement in 1986, he was the longest-working employee at Disney, having worked there for 53 years. He died on October 25, 1988, at the age of 83.

Filmography

References

External links
 
 Disney Legends

1905 births
1988 deaths
People from Emery County, Utah
American people of Danish descent
Animators from Utah
Walt Disney Animation Studios people
Burials at Forest Lawn Memorial Park (Hollywood Hills)